Qualification for the 2019 Little League World Series took place in eight United States regions and eight international regions from June through August 2019.

United States 
All eight regional tournaments will follow a modified double elimination format. The regional finals will be a single game.

Great Lakes 
The tournament took place in Westfield, Indiana from August 4–10.

Mid-Atlantic 
The tournament took place in Bristol, Connecticut from August 4–10.

Midwest 
The tournament took place in Westfield, Indiana from August 3–10. For the first time, North Dakota and South Dakota are sending separate teams to the tournament; in previous years one team represented both states.

New England 
The tournament took place in Bristol, Connecticut from August 4–10.

Northwest 
The tournament took place in San Bernardino, California August 4–10.

Southeast 
The tournament took place in Warner Robins, Georgia from August 2–7.

Southwest 
The tournament took place in Waco, Texas August 1–7.

West 
The tournament took place in San Bernardino, California August 4–10.

International

Asia-Pacific 
The tournament took place in Hwaseong, South Korea from June 22–28.  The top two teams from each pool advanced to the semifinals.

Pool play

Pool A

Pool B

Knockout round

Australia 
The tournament took place in Lismore, New South Wales from June 6–10. The top two teams in each pool advanced to the elimination round.

Pool round

Pool A

Pool B

Pool C

Pool D

Knockout round

Canada 
The tournament took place in Ancaster, Ontario from August 1–10. The top four teams will advance to the semifinals.

Caribbean 
The tournament took place in Willemstad, Curacao from July 13–20. The top two teams from each pool advance to the semifinals.

Europe and Africa 

The Europe-Africa qualifier tournament took place from July 12–16. The format of the qualifier tournament is a round robin with an elimination round where the two semifinal winners advanced to the double-elimination regional tournament from July 19–26. Both tournaments took place in Kutno, Poland.

Qualifier tournament

Regional tournament

Japan 
This single elimination tournament took place in Ueda, Nagano from July 19–22.

Latin America 
The tournament took place in Aguadulce, Panama from July 6–13. The top four teams advanced to the semifinals.

Mexico 

The tournament took place in Sabinas from July 6–12. The top two teams from each pool advanced to the semifinals.

References

qualification
2019 in baseball